The  (JCGA) is a university-level service academy established within the Ministry of Land, Infrastructure, Transport and Tourism for the purpose of training students to become Coast guard officers. It is located in Kure, Hiroshima prefecture.

The cadets learn specialized knowledge on international maritime law, naval police theory, maritime traffic policy and earn a Bachelor of Science following a rigorous 4 year and 9 month curriculum unique to the Academy.

Graduates of JCGA go out into the fleet as junior officers, alternatively working at land-based offices and Coast Guard vessels as they advance in their careers.

Charter
The purpose of the JCGA is stipulated in Article 255 of the Ministry of Land, Infrastructure, Transport and Tourism Organization Ordinance reads as follows:

Admissions
Students are typically selected from recent graduates of Japanese civilian senior high schools who have completed twelve years of formal schooling. Applicants must pass the entrance examination as required for a public university, but unlike a regular university, students who enter JCGA become cadets serving in the Japan Coast Guard. The applicant must meet the requirements for becoming an officer in the Coast Guard, such as age and Japanese nationality, which differ from the requirements for general university applicants. The cost of tuition is paid by the Japanese government and cadets receive a stipend as civil servants (as of 2017, about ¥140,000 per month), as with cadets at the National Defense Academy of Japan, National Defense Medical College, and the United States Coast Guard Academy.

Approximately 60 cadets are accepted by JCGA every year. The total population of the JCGA is about 220, of which 11% are female as of 2020.

The National Institution for Academic Degrees and Quality Enhancement of Higher Education, an Independent Administrative Institution affiliated with the Ministry of Education, Culture, Sports, Science and Technology (MEXT) has recognised the courses and awards the graduates degrees on request. As the Academy is not an MEXT-recognised university, it cannot offer its own degrees.

Academics

Cadets study basic education subjects including English, maritime law, physics, and political science in the first and second years, and begin taking specialized subjects in navigation and engineering in the second half of the second year. Courses in subjects such as bridge resource management, business management, information science, international law, leadership, meteorology, oceanography, and languages such as Chinese, Korean, and Russian are offered as electives. Several domestic and international voyages are required for graduation including a 3 month deployment following completion of studies aboard the training ship JCG Kojima (PL-21). In 2011, courses in international business were added to improve language skills and the cadets' ability to respond to international incidents.

The JCGA participates in exchanges with foreign coast guard organizations such as the United States Coast Guard Academy, Canadian Coast Guard College, Korea Maritime and Ocean University, and the Philippines, Malaysia, Sri Lanka, and other counterparts.

In response to increased Grey-zone challenges affecting many of Japan's Indo-Pacific neighbors, JCGA introduced the Maritime Safety and Security Policy Program in 2015, a master’s degree program for junior coast guard officers from Japan and other Asian coast guard agencies in international law, international relations, maritime police policy, and other relevant subjects through the National Graduate Institute for Policy Studies. Along with international students from other Indo-Pacific countries, students learn how to deal with various issues that arise at sea, and have the opportunity to acquire professional knowledge and analytical skills.

Campus
The JCGA is located in the Wakaba-cho neighborhood of Kure, Hiroshima, on land previously belonging to the Kure Naval Arsenal. The present campus was opened in 1952 after JCGA's founding a year earlier in Tokyo to provide officers for the newly established Maritime Safety Agency following the dissolution of the Imperial Japanese Navy by Allied forces.

About 8,000 books from the former Imperial Japanese Naval War College, have been preserved at the JCGA library including tactical books from the early 19th century, diplomatic documents from the time of World War I, and books previously owned by Admiral Heihachiro Togo.

The Japan Coast Guard Museum is also located on the JCGA campus, containing approximately 1,000 items, such as photographs of historic patrol boats, ship models, and artifacts from the Battle of Amami-Oshima (2001).

In Popular Culture
JCGA has been featured in several Japanese film and television shows including Keisuke Kinoshita's Big Joys, Small Sorrows (1986), and the Umizaru franchise, based on the popular manga by Shuho Sato.

See also
Japan Coast Guard
Military academy
Big Joys, Small Sorrows
Umizaru

References

External links

 

Daigakkō in Japan
Military academies of Japan
Japan Coast Guard
Coast guard academies
Naval academies
Universities and colleges in Hiroshima Prefecture